Greeley County (county code: GL) is a county located in western Kansas, in the Central United States.  Its county seat and largest city is Tribune.  As of the 2020 census, the population was 1,284, the least populous county in Kansas.  As of 2018, it is tied with Wallace County as the least densely populated county in the state. The county is named after Horace Greeley of Chappaqua, New York, editor of the New York Tribune. Greeley encouraged western settlement with the motto "Go West, young man".

History

Early history

For many millennia, the Great Plains of North America was inhabited by nomadic Native Americans.  From the 16th century to 18th century, the Kingdom of France claimed ownership of large parts of North America.  In 1762, after the French and Indian War, France secretly ceded New France to Spain, per the Treaty of Fontainebleau.

19th century
In 1802, Spain returned most of the land to France, but keeping title to about 7,500 square miles.  In 1803, most of the land for modern day Kansas was acquired by the United States from France as part of the 828,000 square mile Louisiana Purchase for 2.83 cents per acre.

In 1854, the Kansas Territory was organized, then in 1861 Kansas became the 34th U.S. state.  In 1873, Greeley County was established.

Geography
It is the largest of five United States counties and twelve (Virginia) independent cities that officially have no water area.

Adjacent counties
 Wallace County (north)
 Wichita County (east/Central Time border)
 Hamilton County (south)
 Prowers County, Colorado (southwest)
 Kiowa County, Colorado (west)
 Cheyenne County, Colorado (northwest)

Demographics

As of the census of 2000, there were 1,534 people, 602 households, and 414 families residing in the county. The population density was 2 people per square mile (1/km2).  There were 712 housing units at an average density of 1 per square mile (0.4/km2).  The racial makeup of the county was 93.09% White, 0.26% Native American, 0.20% Black or African American, 0.13% Pacific Islander, 0.07% Asian, 5.22% from other races, and 1.04% from two or more races. Hispanic or Latino of any race were 11.54% of the population.

There were 602 households, out of which 34.20% had children under the age of 18 living with them, 61.10% were married couples living together, 4.50% had a female householder with no husband present, and 31.20% were non-families. 28.60% of all households were made up of individuals, and 12.80% had someone living alone who was 65 years of age or older.  The average household size was 2.50 and the average family size was 3.10.

In the county, the population was spread out, with 28.20% under the age of 18, 6.80% from 18 to 24, 27.30% from 25 to 44, 19.90% from 45 to 64, and 17.70% who were 65 years of age or older.  The median age was 39 years. For every 100 females there were 98.40 males.  For every 100 females age 18 and over, there were 92.80 males.

The median income for a household in the county was $34,605, and the median income for a family was $45,625. Males had a median income of $29,018 versus $18,984 for females. The per capita income for the county was $19,974.  About 8.20% of families and 11.60% of the population were below the poverty line, including 14.20% of those under age 18 and 6.80% of those age 65 or over.

Government

County
As of January 1, 2009, Greeley County and the City of Tribune have operated as a unified government. The resulting government consists of a five-member commission with two members elected by city residents, two by rural residents, and one at-large.  Similar to Wyandotte County, the only other consolidated city-county in the state, part of the county was not included: Horace decided against consolidation.

Presidential elections
This county is often carried by Republican candidates, as are most rural western Kansas counties. The last time a Democratic candidate won the county was in 1976, and a Democratic candidate has only won the county three times in its history: 1932 (Franklin D. Roosevelt), 1964 (Lyndon B. Johnson), and most recently in 1976 by Jimmy Carter.

Laws
The Kansas Constitution was amended in 1986 to allow the sale of alcoholic liquor by the individual drink with the approval of voters. Greeley County remained a prohibition, or "dry", county until 2008, when voters approved to allow sales of liquor by the drink.

Education

Unified school districts
 Greeley County USD 200

Communities

Cities
 Horace
 Tribune

Ghost Towns
 Astor
 Colokan
 Hector
 Walkinghood
 Whitelaw

Townships
Greeley County was previously divided into three townships.  However, in 1992, Colony Township and Harrison Township were merged into Tribune Township, leaving only one township for the county.  This was not reported to the U.S. census until 2006, thus the 2000 census did not reflect the merger, but the 2010 census did.

None of the cities within the county are considered governmentally independent, and all figures for the townships include those of the cities.  In the following table, the population center is the largest city (or cities) included in that township's population total, if it is of a significant size.

See also
Horace Greeley Museum, home in Tribune of the Greeley County Historical Society

References

Notes

Further reading

External links

County
 
 Greeley County - Directory of Public Officials
Maps
 Greeley County maps: Current, Historic, KDOT
 Kansas highway maps: Current, Historic, KDOT
 Kansas railroad maps: Current, 1996, 1915, KDOT and Kansas Historical Society

 
Kansas counties
1873 establishments in Kansas
Populated places established in 1873